Crescent Bay is a cove in the northeast side of Duke of York Island in Robertson Bay, northern Victoria Land, Antarctica. It was charted and so named because of its shape by the British Antarctic Expedition, 1898–1900, under C.E. Borchgrevink. The feature is the site of an Adélie penguin rookery. The bay lies situated on the Pennell Coast, a portion of Antarctica lying between Cape Williams and Cape Adare.

References
 

Bays of Victoria Land
Pennell Coast